Liverpool's Hydraulic Power Company were the operators of a public hydraulic power network supplying energy across the city of Liverpool, England, via a system of high-pressure water pipes from two pumping stations. The system was the third public system to be built in England, opening in 1888. It expanded rapidly, but gradually declined as electric power become more readily available. The pumping station was converted to electric operation in 1960, but the system was turned off in 1971. One of the pump sets was salvaged and presented to the Liverpool Museum.

History
The Liverpool Hydraulic Power Co obtained Acts of Parliament in 1884 and 1887, to allow it to construct a hydraulic power network under the streets of Liverpool. The system was operational by 1888, and was the third such undertaking in Britain, following the opening of the first system in Hull in 1877, and the second in London in 1883.

Demand for power grew, and by 1890 there were two power stations, one on Athol Street to the north, and the other on Grafton Street in the south of the city. Nine triple-expansion pumps could supply  of water per day to the system, which now had  of pipes, and by 1895 there were 453 hydraulic machines connected to the network. In addition to lifts, cranes and packing machines, the water also supplied hydrants and sprinklers which were used in case of fire.

The Institute of Mechanical Engineers made a visit to Liverpool in June 1891, to inspect various works, and details of the hydraulic power system were published in The Practical Engineer later that year. The pressure mains were made of cast iron, and the flanged joints were sealed with gutta-percha rings. Where possible, the pipes were laid in circuits, so that sections could be isolated for repairs or extensions, without interruption of the supply to others beyond the isolated section. The steam engines were supplied by the Hydraulic Power Company of Chester, run by Edward B. Ellington, the man behind the first British system at Hull. Steam for the first two pumping sets was supplied by three Lancashire boilers, which were fitted with mechanical stokers, operated by hydraulic power.

Under the terms of their Acts of Parliament, the company had rights to lay mains beneath the streets in some parts of Liverpool, but in others they needed the consent of Liverpool Corporation. This consent was not always forthcoming, and there complaints in 1889 that the Corporation were obstructing the expansion of the system to allow it to supply buildings owned by the Exchange Company, the Liverpool and London and Globe Insurance Company, the British and Foreign Marine Insurance Company, and the Prudential Assurance Company. All of them had water-powered lifts, which were fed from the Corporation's own low-pressure mains. There were eight lifts in total, and over the course of a year, they used , for which they paid the Corporation £700. If they had been connected to the high-pressure system, the volume of water used would only have been , which would have cost £340. The high-pressure lifts were also significantly faster. A lift in African Chambers on Old Hall Street, when carrying three people, took 38 seconds to rise , but when converted to work from the high-pressure main, only took 15 seconds for the same journey. The volume of water used dropped by 94.3 per cent on the new system.

Decline
Around 1960, the steam engines at Athol Street pumping station were replaced by electric pumps. The Hathorn Davey pumps had been installed at King's Cross railway station in 1924, and were obtained secondhand. The system continued in operation for only a few more years, and was shut down in 1971. One of the Hathorn Davey pumps and various other items of equipment were salvaged, and transferred to the Merseyside County Museum, now the Liverpool Museum. The records of the company are held in the reserve store of the museum.

Points of interest

See also
 London Hydraulic Power Company
 Manchester Hydraulic Power

Bibliography

References

Hydraulics
Subterranea of the United Kingdom
Utilities of the United Kingdom